Vuyo Dabula (born 11 September 1976) is a South African model, actor and bodybuilder. He is best known for his role as Shandu Magwaza in the Netflix crime drama, Queen Sono.

Early life
He studied at P.H Moeketsi Agricultural High where he matriculated in 1995, followed by Wits Technikon, where he graduated after a year in 1996. He claimed what he studied in school was not something he was interested in making his career for the future; instead he started acting. For acting, he studied at AFDA Cape Town.

Career 
He is most famous for his role of Kumkani Phakade in the South African soap, Generations. Vuyo also appeared in Avengers: Age of Ultron (2015) and he played the main role in the 2017 film Five Fingers for Marseilles. Vuyo currently stars as Shandu, a spy turned rebel as well as a love interest to Pearl Thusi's character in Netflix's first African original series, Queen Sono. In April 2020, the series was renewed by Netflix for a second season. However, on November 26, 2020, it was reported that Netflix has cancelled the series because of the production challenges brought on by the COVID-19 pandemic.

Filmography

Film

Television

References

External links
 Vuyo Dabula on TVSA

1976 births
Living people
21st-century South African male actors
South African male film actors
South African male television actors
People from Mahikeng